Yashilkul is a freshwater lake in Gorno-Badakhshan Autonomous Province, in southeast Tajikistan, about  east of the provincial capital of Khorugh. The lake forms part of the Bulunkul and Yashilkul lakes and mountains Important Bird Area.

References

Lakes of Tajikistan
Important Bird Areas of Tajikistan
Gorno-Badakhshan Autonomous Region